is a Japanese football player.

Club statistics
Updated to 23 February 2018.

References

External links
Profile at Giravanz Kitakyushu

1986 births
Living people
Tokai University alumni
Association football people from Ibaraki Prefecture
Japanese footballers
J1 League players
J2 League players
J3 League players
Kashima Antlers players
Montedio Yamagata players
Giravanz Kitakyushu players
Association football midfielders